Mibei Miao Ethnic Township is a rural ethnic township in Xinhuang Dong Autonomous County, Hunan, China. It is surrounded by Butouxiang Miao Ethnic Township on the north, Biyong Town of Zhijiang Dong Autonomous County on the west, Zhongzhai Town on the east, and Wengdong Town of Tianzhu County on the south.

History
Before 1955 it belonged to Zhijiang Dong Autonomous County. In December 1956 it came under the jurisdiction of Xinhuang Dong Autonomous County and the Mibei Township was founded. In September 1958 it was renamed "Mibei People's Commune". In June 1984 its name was changed to "Mibei Miao Ethnic Township".

Geography

The forest coverage of this town is 76.5%.

There are seven streams in the township. The Zhonghe Stream, a tributary of the Qingshui River, flows through the town west to east.

Economy
The local economy is primarily based upon agriculture and local industry. Wood processing is a major industry.

The streams in the township are clear, rich in catfish, dragonet, Chinese giant salamander and other rare fish species.

The main local specialties of this township are gastrodia elata, eucommia ulmoides, lilium, chestnut, umeboshi, citrus, charcoal, stele stone, phyllostachys edulis, fine bamboo basket, etc.

Education
There are one ordinary middle school, one central primary school and 15 village primary schools in this township.

References

Xinhuang
Miao ethnic townships